Benson County is a county in the U.S. state of North Dakota. As of the 2020 census, the population was 5,964. Its county seat is Minnewaukan. The county was created on March 9, 1883 by the Dakota Territory legislature, and was named for Bertil W. Benson, a Dakota Territory legislator at the time. The county government was organized on June 4, 1884, and its boundary lines were altered by two legislative actions in 1885.

White Horse Hill National Game Preserve and much of the Spirit Lake Indian Reservation are located within the county.

Geography
Much of the east boundary line of Benson County is delineated by the shore of Devils Lake, a closed-capture lake which would spill into the Sheyenne River in an overflow condition. The North Fork Sheyenne River flows southeasterly through the lower SW portion of the county.

The terrain of Benson County consists of rolling hills dotted with lakes, ponds and drainages. The terrain slopes to the east, and its highest point is on the lower portion of its west boundary line, at 1,624' (495m) ASL.

Adjacent counties

 Towner County – north
 Ramsey County – northeast
 Nelson County – east
 Eddy County – southeast
 Wells County – southwest
 Pierce County – west

Major highways

  U.S. Highway 2
  U.S. Highway 281
  North Dakota Highway 19
  North Dakota Highway 20
  North Dakota Highway 57

Protected areas

 Buffalo Lake National Wildlife Refuge (part)
 Grahams Island State Park (part)
 Pleasant Lake National Wildlife Refuge
 Silver Lake National Wildlife Refuge (part)
 White Horse Hill National Game Preserve
 Volk National Wildlife Refuge
 Wood Lake National Wildlife Refuge
 Wurgler National Wildlife Refuge

Lakes

 Broken Bone Lake
 Cranberry Lake
 Free Peoples Lake
 Horseshoe Lake
 Lake Murie
 Lake Yri
 Long Lake
 Sand Lake
 Shin Bone Lake
 Spring Lake
 Stink Lake
 Stony Lake
 Wood Lake

Demographics

2000 census
As of the 2000 census, there were 6,964 people, 2,328 households, and 1,701 families in the county. The population density was 5 people per square mile (2/km2). There were 2,932 housing units at an average density of 2 per square mile (1/km2). The racial makeup of the county was mostly White (50.85%) and Native American (48.05%). In addition, 0.10% are Black/African American, 0.01% are Asian, 0.01% are Pacific Islander, 0.16% are from other races, and 0.82% are from two or more races. 0.79% of the population were Hispanic or Latino of any race. 25.2% were of Norwegian and 14.8% German ancestry.

There were 2,328 households, out of which 38.00% had children under the age of 18 living with them, 48.50% were married couples living together, 16.60% had a female householder with no husband present, and 26.90% were non-families. 24.50% of all households were made up of individuals, and 12.50% had someone living alone who was 65 years of age or older.  The average household size was 2.97 and the average family size was 3.48.

The county population contained 36.10% under the age of 18, 7.80% from 18 to 24, 23.30% from 25 to 44, 19.40% from 45 to 64, and 13.50% who were 65 years of age or older. The median age was 31 years. For every 100 females there were 102.10 males. For every 100 females age 18 and over, there were 102.00 males.

The median income for a household in the county was $26,688, and the median income for a family was $31,558. Males had a median income of $23,056 versus $17,862 for females. The per capita income for the county was $11,509. About 24.40% of families and 29.10% of the population were below the poverty line, including 38.90% of those under age 18 and 16.70% of those age 65 or over.

2010 census
As of the 2010 census, there were 6,660 people, 2,233 households, and 1,628 families in the county. The racial makeup of the county was 55.0% American Indian, 43.4% white, 0.2% from other races, and 1.4% from two or more races. Those of Hispanic or Latino origin made up 1.2% of the population. In terms of ancestry, 22.0% were Norwegian, 18.0% were German, 5.0% were Irish, and 0.6% were American.

Of the 2,233 households, 41.3% had children under the age of 18 living with them, 42.3% were married couples living together, 20.6% had a female householder with no husband present, 27.1% were non-families, and 23.2% of all households were made up of individuals. The average household size was 2.98 and the average family size was 3.46. The median age was 31.6 years.

The median income for a household in the county was $30,479 and the median income for a family was $34,597. Males had a median income of $31,729 versus $25,253 for females. The per capita income for the county was $14,545. About 26.1% of families and 35.6% of the population were below the poverty line, including 48.3% of those under age 18 and 16.9% of those age 65 or over.

Population by decade

Communities
Cities and CDPs have population included as of 2020, and townships have the population as of 2020. The largest community by far is Fort Totten, followed by Leeds, Maddock and the county seat, Minnewaukan. There are nine cities in the county. The largest township by a 60% margin is Mission (935), which is on the south shore of Devils Lake and is popular for vacationing, as well as gambling at the Spirit Lake Casino and Resort. It is within the Spirit Lake Indian Reservation. It is followed by Wood Lake Township (471), immediately to the south of Mission Township and also included in the reservation. The third largest is Lallie Township (325), to the west of Fort Totten on the south shore of Devils Lake and within the reservation.

Cities

 Brinsmade- 30
 Esmond- 91
 Knox- 22
 Leeds- 442
 Maddock- 402
 Minnewaukan (county seat)- 199
 Oberon- 101
 Warwick- 55
 York- 17

Census-designated place
 Fort Totten- 1,160

Unincorporated communities

 Baker
 Comstock
 Fillmore
 Flora
 Harlow
 Hesper
 Isabel
 Josephine
 Lallie
 Niles
 Pleasant Lake
 Saint Michael
 Tilden
 Tokio

Townships

 Albert- 48
 Arne- 54
 Aurora- 18
 Beaver- 29
 Broe- 58
 Butte Valley- 50
 East Fork- 21
 Eldon- 28
 Esmond- 35
 Hesper- 37
 Impark- 33
 Iowa- 30
 Irvine- 45
 Isabel- 30
 Knox- 28
 Lake Ibsen- 14
 Lallie- 325
 Leeds- 45
 Lohnes- 78
 McClellan- 25
 Minco- 25
 Mission- 935
 Normania- 25
 North Viking- 57
 Oberon- 62
 Pleasant Lake- 45
 Rich Valley- 29
 Riggin- 35
 Rock- 54
 South Viking- 39
 Twin Lake- 36
 Twin Tree- 83
 Warwick- 67
 West Antelope- 30
 West Bay- 35
 Wood Lake- 471
 York- 35

Politics
Typical of many counties in the state where a significant share of the population is Native American, Benson County leans Democratic in presidential elections. Prior to 2020, no Republican candidate had won the majority of the county's votes since Ronald Reagan in 1984. However, George W. Bush in 2000 & Donald Trump in 2016 both won a plurality of the county's votes.

Education
School districts include:

K-12:

 Dakota Prairie Public School District 1
 Devils Lake Public School District 1
 Fort Totten Public School District 30
 Harvey Public School District 38
 Leeds Public School District 6
 Maddock Public School District 9
 Minnewaukan Public School District 5
 New Rockford-Sheyenne Public School District 2
 North Star School District
 Rugby Public School District 5
 Warwick Public School District 29

Elementary districts:
 Oberon Public School District 16

See also
 National Register of Historic Places listings in Benson County, North Dakota

References

External links
 Benson County maps, Sheet 1 (eastern) and Sheet 2 (western), North Dakota DOT

 
1884 establishments in Dakota Territory